USS S-19 (SS-124) was a first-group (S-1 or "Holland") S-class submarine of the United States Navy. She was in commission from 1921 to 1922 and from 1923 to 1934 and served in both the Atlantic and Pacific Oceans.

Construction and commissioning
S-19′s keel was laid down on 15 August 1918 by the Electric Boat Company in New York City on subcontract to Bethlehem Shipbuilding Corporation's Fore River Shipyard in Quincy, Massachusetts. She was launched on 21 June 1920, sponsored by Miss Genevieve Kittinger (daughter of Commander T. A. Kittinger, U.S. Navy inspector of ordnance), and commissioned on 24 August 1921.

Service history
After preliminary shakedown operations, S-19 was decommissioned and returned to the contractor on 8 March 1922 for further work to remedy defects revealed in her first weeks of operation. Upon her return to the United States Navy, S-19 recommissioned at Groton, Connecticut, on 6 January 1923.

S-19 operated off the northeastern coast of the United States from 1923 to 1930, taking part in fleet exercises off Panama in the early months of each year. This routine was interrupted in the foggy, early hours of 13 January 1925, when the submarine ran aground off Chatham, Massachusetts, on the southern coast of Cape Cod, after strong winds and unusually heavy seas had pushed her far from her course. She had departed Portsmouth Navy Yard in Kittery, Maine, the previous afternoon after overhaul, and was en route to New London, Connecticut. The United States Coast Guard cutters  and  came to S-19s assistance, as did life-saving crews from two nearby Coast Guard stations. Heavy seas made it impossible to pass a line to the grounded submarine or to reach her by boat until late on the evening of 14 January, when a party from the Nauset, Massachusetts, Coast Guard station succeeded in boarding. By the morning of 15 January, S-19s crew had been safely brought to shore. After strenuous effort by Navy tugs and the Coast Guard cutters, S-19 was finally freed from the shoal.

Repaired and returned to service with the fleet, S-19 continued her Atlantic operations until 22 October 1930, when she departed New London for the Pacific Ocean. The submarine arrived at Pearl Harbor, Hawaii, on 7 December 1930, and for the next three years operated from there. She was decommissioned at Pearl Harbor on 10 February 1934.

Disposal
S-19 was struck from the Naval Vessel Register on 12 December 1936. She was towed to sea and scuttled on 18 December 1938 in accordance with the terms of the Second London Naval Treaty.

In fiction

S-19 was featured in the Call of Cthulhu: Dark Corners of the Earth campaign Raid on Innsmouth.

References

United States S-class submarines
United States submarine accidents
Maritime incidents in 1925
Maritime incidents in 1938
Shipwrecks in the Pacific Ocean
Shipwrecks of Hawaii
Scuttled vessels
Ships built in Quincy, Massachusetts
1920 ships